Hultberg is a surname. Notable people with the surname include:

Johan Hultberg (born 1985), Swedish politician
John Hultberg (1922–2005), American painter
Jordy Hultberg, American basketball player and coach
Otto Hultberg (1877–1954), Swedish sport shooter
Peer Hultberg (1935–2007), Danish writer and psychoanalyst
Poul Hultberg (1920–2016), Danish architect